The 1969–70 Illinois Fighting Illini men's basketball team represented the University of Illinois.

Regular season

The 1969-70 basketball season for head coach Harv Schmidt saw his team enter the collegiate top 25 rankings in December, only to fall back off the chart in February.  The team was led in scoring for the season by Greg Jackson, Mike Price and Rick Howat.  Price would finish his senior season by being named on the Converse honorable mention All-American team. The Fighting Illini would go on to finish the season with a 15-9 overall record and tied for 3rd place in the conference with an 8-6 record.

The 1969-70 team's starting lineup included Randy Crews and Fred Miller at the forward spots, Price and Howat as guards and Jackson at center.

Roster

Source

Schedule
																																																
Source																																																																																																
																																																
|-												
!colspan=12 style="background:#DF4E38; color:white;"| Non-Conference regular season

	

|-
!colspan=9 style="background:#DF4E38; color:#FFFFFF;"|Big Ten regular season

|-

Player stats

Awards and honors
Rick Howat
Team Most Valuable Player 
Mike Price
Honorable Mention All-American (Converse)

Team players drafted into the NBA

Rankings

References

Illinois Fighting Illini
Illinois Fighting Illini men's basketball seasons
Illinois
Illinois